"Ticks" is a song co-written and recorded by American country music artist Brad Paisley. It was released in March 2007 as the first single from his 2007 album 5th Gear. The song reached number one on the US Billboard Hot Country Songs chart. Paisley wrote this song with Kelley Lovelace and Tim Owens.

This song was featured as a downloadable track for the video game Guitar Hero: World Tour.

Content
The song's main character is at a bar, attempting to pick up a date. In doing so, he uses several humorous pickup lines, such as "I'd like to check you for ticks."

Paisley stated that the song is not about blood-sucking arachnids but rather about a guy flirting with a gal. Paisley was inspired to write the song from experience working on a farm. “Working out here on the farm, I literally have to check for ticks every time I come in from the woods or the fields,” he notes. “Now, if a young guy who lives in the country were to take a girl into the woods for any reason, it would totally cross his mind that she’s going to have to check for ticks when they come back out. So it seems that an enterprising guy would at least consider that he could offer to check for her.”

Critical reception
Kevin John Coyne of Country Universe gave the song a C− grade. While saying that the production was good, he went on to say "[the song] may be the very first mainstream country single to completely skeeze [him] out."

Personnel
Ron Block - banjo
Randle Currie - steel guitar
Eric Darken - percussion
Kevin "Swine" Grantt - bass guitar, upright bass
Wes Hightower - background vocals
Gary Hokker - baritone guitar, 12 string guitar
Gordon Mote - clavinet
Brad Paisley - lead vocals, electric guitar, acoustic guitar, Tic tac bass
Ben Sesar - drums
Justin Williamson - mandolin

Chart performance

Weekly charts

Year-end charts

Certifications

References

2007 singles
2007 songs
Brad Paisley songs
Songs written by Brad Paisley
Song recordings produced by Frank Rogers (record producer)
Arista Nashville singles
Songs written by Kelley Lovelace
Songs written by Tim Owens